Pusch Ridge Christian Academy is a private Christian school located in northwest Tucson, Arizona,  on a  campus. Pusch Ridge Christian Academy is a ministry of  Catalina Foothills Church, PCA. The school is accredited by ACSI (Association of Christian Schools International).

History
In 1958, Charles and Anna Egleston donated  of pristine desert property in the foothills at the base of Pusch Ridge in the Catalina Mountains to Palo Verde Baptist Church, to be used "for religious and educational purposes only," with a firm vision that the property would support a school grounded in Christian values and faith.  The property was subdivided in late 1977 for the establishment of Canyon Del Oro Baptist Church on the southern 16 acres.  The other  remained undeveloped through 1982, when Max Wilford, the president of the Palo Verde Christian School Board directed the commencement of construction on the Egleston property. Wilford intended to relocate Palo Verde Christian School from its location in Tucson to the property in Oro Valley.  In the fall of 1994, Palo Verde Christian High School opened its doors on the property in Oro Valley. This new location served grades 6–12, while grades K–5 remained at the Palo Verde Baptist Church property in Tucson.  By early 2000, the school was struggling and it was at that time that the leadership of Catalina Foothills Church, PCA, wanted to open a Christian high school. Through the leadership of David Mehl and other members, ownership of the school transferred from Palo Verde Baptist Church to Catalina Foothills in early 2000. In February 2000, Pusch Ridge Christian Academy was officially established.

The main entrance to the Pusch Ridge campus and Canyon Del Oro Baptist from North Oracle Road is named Egleston Memorial Drive in honor of Mr. and Mrs. Egleston, and North Egleston Drive running just east of the nearby James D. Kriegh Park also honors the Eglestons.

Pusch Ridge currently has a K–12 enrollment of over 700 students.

Athletics
The high school varsity girls' basketball team, coached by Lonnie Tvrdy, won the Arizona state championship four years in a row from 2005 to 2008, but were eliminated from the championship in February 2009.

The high school varsity girls' cross-country team placed second at the 2011 State Meet at Cave Creek Golf Course for Division IV.

The Pusch Ridge baseball team, coached by former major league pitcher  Doug Jones, won the Arizona 2A state championship in 2009.

The following year, under head coach Mark Frithsen, the Lions had an undefeated season led by team captains Alec Erceg, Owen Bertelsen, and Aaron Vaughn before being defeated in the semi-final game as they attempted to defend their state championship title. 2011 saw limited success for the Lions, who finished with a losing record but still made the playoffs, led by senior captains Kory Santaella, Colin Chafin, and Alfonso Ferrari.

In the 2012 baseball season, Pusch Ridge made it to the state playoffs again but lost in the second round to eventual State Champs St. David High School. In the 2013 season, Pusch Ridge lost in the third round.

In 2014, the Lions went 26–5 and made it to the State Championship game. The team broke many school team records with their amazing season. The team was led by seniors Jacob Frithsen, Mike Doty, Ryan Penny, Chad Willis, Kyle Hammond and Phillip Tanner. Frithsen and Doty both had remarkable seasons pitching, while both pitchers posted an under 1.50 ERA. They were led on the offensive side where Frithsen, Penny and Tanner all had an average over .400. Frithsen, Doty, Penny and Tanner were all named to the Division 4 AZBCA All-Star game where the south won 14–6 and Frithsen earned MVP honors. He threw three innings only giving up one run and had a two-RBI single to get things started for the South. The team is coached by Mark Frithsen and Scott Polston.

Lions football has seen great success in their history, mainly with Bob Vance at the helm.  They made the playoffs and went undefeated in regional play for three straight years.  In the 2015 season the Lions won division 4 state championships against  Northwest Christian High School (Arizona).

References

External links
 PRCA school homepage
 Catalina Foothills Church, PCA

Christian schools in Arizona
Educational institutions established in 2000
Private high schools in Arizona
Schools in Pima County, Arizona
Private middle schools in Arizona
2000 establishments in Arizona